The magpie mannikin or magpie munia (Spermestes fringilloides) is a species of estrildid finch, sparsely present across Sub-Saharan Africa. It has an estimated global extent of occurrence of 1,400,000 km2.

It is found in subtropical/ tropical (lowland) moist shrubland, forest and dry grassland habitat. The status of the species is evaluated as Least Concern.

Origin

Origin and phylogeny has been obtained by Antonio Arnaiz-Villena et al. Estrildinae may have originated in India and dispersed thereafter (towards Africa and Pacific Ocean habitats).

References

BirdLife Species Factsheet

External links
 Magpie mannikin - Species text in The Atlas of Southern African Birds.

magpie mannikin
Birds of Sub-Saharan Africa
magpie mannikin